Valentina Alexandra Firsova (22 September 1937 – 19 December 2022) was a Soviet-Russian politician. A member of the Communist Party, she served on the Supreme Soviet of the Soviet Union from 1974 to 1979.

Firsova died in Bender on 19 December 2022, at the age of 85.

References

1937 births
2022 deaths
Communist Party of the Soviet Union members
Ninth convocation members of the Supreme Soviet of the Soviet Union
Heroes of Socialist Labour
Recipients of the Order of Lenin
Recipients of the Order of the Red Banner of Labour
People from Glushkovsky District